Events in the year 2017 in Ecuador.

Incumbents
President: Rafael Correa (until 24 May); Lenín Moreno (from 24 May)
Vice President: Jorge Glas

Events

19 February – The Ecuadorian general election was held alongside a referendum on tax havens. In the first round of the presidential elections, PAIS Alliance candidate Lenín Moreno received 39% of the vote, while his nearest rival was Guillermo Lasso of the Creating Opportunities party, and a second election round was required.

2 April – In the second round of the presidential election, Lenín Moreno was elected President with 51.16% of the vote.

24 May – Lenín Moreno took over as the new president of Ecuador.

Deaths

7 January – Luis Alberto Luna Tobar, Roman Catholic prelate, archbishop (b. 1923).

References

 
2010s in Ecuador
Years of the 21st century in Ecuador
Ecuador
Ecuador